The 1878 Harvard Crimson football team represented Harvard University in the 1878 college football season. They finished with a 1–2 record. The team captain, for the second consecutive year, was Livingston Cushing.

On November 9, Harvard opened its football season with a victory over Amherst at Boston's South End Grounds. Harvard scored three goals and three touchdowns and held Amherst scoreless.

On November 16, Harvard lost to Princeton in a game played before approximately 1,000 spectators at the Boston Baseball Grounds. The New York Herald called it "a magnificent contest."

One week later, on November 23, Harvard lost to Yale before 700 spectators at the Boston Baseball Grounds. Yale won on a kick for goal.

Schedule

References

Harvard
Harvard Crimson football seasons
Harvard Crimson football
19th century in Boston